Virginia's 45th House of Delegates district elects one of 100 seats in the Virginia House of Delegates, the lower house of the state's bicameral legislature. District 45 includes part of the city of Alexandria as well as parts of Arlington and Fairfax counties. The seat has been represented by Democrat Elizabeth Bennett-Parker since 2022.

Geography 
District 45 consists of the eastern half of the city of Alexandria and parts of Arlington and Fairfax counties. It is in Virginia's 8th Congressional District.

Electoral history 
Democrat Mark Levine won a five-way Democratic Primary in June 2015 and was elected without opposition that fall. He was re-elected without opposition in 2017, receiving the highest vote total of any 2017 candidate for the Virginia House of Delegates.

Levine ran for reelection unchallenged in the November 2019 general election and was elected to a third term. Levine lost renomination in 2021.

Election results

References

Alexandria, Virginia
Arlington County, Virginia
Government in Fairfax County, Virginia
Virginia House of Delegates districts